Norwich is a census-designated place (CDP) that comprises the central village of the town of Norwich, Windsor County, Vermont, United States.  As of the 2010 census, the population of the CDP was 878, compared to 3,414 for the entire town of Norwich.

Geography
Norwich is located in northeastern Windsor County. U.S. Route 5 passes through the village, connecting with Thetford to the north and White River Junction to the south. Interstate 91 forms the eastern edge of the CDP, with access to the village at Exit 13. Vermont Route 10A leads east from Exit 13 across the Connecticut River to Hanover, New Hampshire.

References

Census-designated places in Vermont
Census-designated places in Windsor County, Vermont